William Gladstone Stewart (15 July 1933 – 21 September 2017) was an English television producer, director, and television presenter, best known as the presenter and producer of the Channel 4 quiz show Fifteen to One from 1988 to 2003.

Early life
Stewart was born on 15 July 1933 in Lancaster. He was orphaned as a child before the age of three, and he was raised in a children's home in Sidcup, Kent. After leaving Shooters Hill Grammar School (now called Shooters Hill Sixth Form College), Stewart was employed in jobs working in an office. He undertook his National Service in Kenya and worked as a teacher in the Royal Army Educational Corps as part of his attachment to the King's African Rifles.

In 1958, Stewart ventured to Southampton to join the Merchant Navy, though an industrial action prevented him from doing so. Instead, he applied to be a redcoat with the seaside resort chain Butlins at Butlin's Pwllheli in North Wales. Stewart said of the opportunity, "I thought I’d have a great time and perhaps work in the kitchens. But, while I was having an interview, a chap asked if I wanted to be a redcoat. He must have seen something in me." There, he organised a talent contest won by Jimmy Tarbuck and led the teenager to become a redcoat and a stand-up comedian.

Broadcasting career
In the following year, Stewart went to a talk organised by the producer T Lesley Jackson about a career in television at the YMCA in Brixton in south-west London, and it encouraged him to speak to Jackson and apply for the job of a call-boy for the BBC's Light Entertainment output. He later became an assistant floor manager and a stage manager, before ending up as a production assistant. After the 1959 general election, Stewart began working as private secretary to Tom Driberg, the Labour Member of Parliament. Driberg taught Stewart about art, classical music and literature, and broadened his social circle.

Stewart was encouraged by the comedian Eric Sykes to enrol on a television director's course in 1965. He was advised his best career path would be to remain in the entertainment industry, and Sykes recommended Stewart to his fellow light entertainment comedian Frank Muir. That same year, Stewart directed episodes of the sitcoms Call It What You Like and Sykes and a... He moved to the rival broadcaster ITV in 1967, and was a director on The Frost Programme, and The Frost Report for Associated-Rediffusion.

Among the many shows he produced or directed were Father, Dear Father, Love Thy Neighbour, Bless This House, My Good Woman, Spooner's Patch, The Rag Trade, Family Fortunes, Don't Forget Your Toothbrush and The Price is Right. He also presented the short-lived 1992 quiz show Famous People, Famous Places, made by his company, Regent Productions (which also produced Fifteen to One) for Thames Television and shown only in the London region. He later sold Regent to Pearson Television, (which also purchased Thames), and they have now been amalgamated (along with the likes of Grundy Productions) into Talkback Thames, the UK arm of FremantleMedia.

In 1998, he successfully sued the Fifteen to One contestant Trevor Montague, who had lied to reappear on the programme. He made a documentary of Tom Driberg in 2009.

Personal life
He was thrice married:
 1. Audrey Harrison (1960–1976) with whom he had one son, Nick.
 2. Sally Geeson (1976–1986) with whom he had one daughter, Hayley, and one son, Barnaby. Geeson is an actress and played Sally Abbot in the sitcom Bless This House for which Stewart was the producer. 
 3. Laura Calland (1997–2017) with whom he had two daughters, Isobel and Hannah. Calland was the voice-over artist for Fifteen to One.

He was a long-standing supporter of the campaign to return the Elgin Marbles to Greece. He joked that if, on an episode of Fifteen to One, too few contestants survived the first round to continue the game, he would give a speech on the Marbles to fill the time. This happened in a 2001 episode, where he gave a lengthy presentation stating the case to return them, for which the channel was criticised.

Death

He died on 21 September 2017 at the age of 84.

References

External links

UK Gameshows Page: William G. Stewart

1933 births
2017 deaths
Butlins Redcoats
English game show hosts
English television presenters
English television producers
People from the Borough of North East Lincolnshire
Elgin Marbles